Georgetown Light is an active light on North Island at the entrance to Winyah Bay southeast of Georgetown, South Carolina. The light is maintained by the U.S. Coast Guard, and the lighthouse is now under the control of State of South Carolina as part of the Tom Yawkey Wildlife Center Heritage Preserve. The lighthouse is on the National Register of Historic Places.

The original lighthouse was a cypress tower. It was destroyed by a storm in 1806. In 1812, a  brick tower was built. A fourth-order Fresnel lens was installed in 1857.

The light was automated in 1986.

References 

Lighthouses completed in 1812
Houses completed in 1812
Towers completed in 1812
Lighthouses on the National Register of Historic Places in South Carolina
Buildings and structures in Georgetown County, South Carolina
National Register of Historic Places in Georgetown County, South Carolina